Unified Display Interface (UDI) was a digital video interface specification released in 2006 which was based on Digital Visual Interface (DVI). It was intended to be a lower cost implementation while providing compatibility with existing High-Definition Multimedia Interface (HDMI) and DVI displays. Unlike HDMI, which is aimed at high-definition multimedia consumer electronics devices such as television monitors and DVD players, UDI was specifically targeted towards computer monitor and video card manufacturers and did not support the transfer of audio data. A contemporary rival standard, DisplayPort, gained significant industry support starting in 2007 and the UDI specification was abandoned shortly thereafter without having released any products.

Development
On December 20, 2005, the UDI Special Interest Group (UDI SIG) was announced, along with a tentative specification called version 0.8. The group, which worked on refining the specification and promoting the interface, was led by Intel and included Apple Computer, Intel, LG, NVIDIA, Samsung, and Silicon Image Inc. 

The announcement of UDI lagged the DisplayPort standard by a few months, which had been unveiled by the Video Electronics Standards Association (VESA) in May 2005. DisplayPort was being developed by a rival consortium including ATI Technologies, Samsung, NVIDIA, Dell, Hewlett Packard, and Molex. Fundamentally, DisplayPort transmits video in packets of data, while the preceding DVI and HDMI standards transmit raw video as a digital signal; UDI took an approach closer to DVI/HDMI. The UDI specification 1.0 was finalized and released in July 2006.  The differences between UDI and HDMI were kept to a minimum since both specifications were designed for long-term compatibility. Again, UDI lagged DisplayPort by a few months, which had released its finalized version 1.0 specification in May 2006.

The group changed its title in late 2006 from "special interest group" to "working group" and contemporary press coverage noted that "UDI is weak when it comes to industry support", accurately predicting the future DisplayPort/HDMI duopoly. In early 2007 Intel started supporting the rival DisplayPort standard; anonymous sources stated the licensing fees associated with HDMI and incorporation of HDCP into DisplayPort swayed Intel's support. Other vendors started to use HDMI version 1.3, and both Intel and Samsung withdrew their support from UDI. There have been no announcements made about UDI since early 2007 and the UDI website became no longer operational after 2007, and it appears the UDI standard was abandoned before products were released.

Technical 
There were two UDI implementations: "external profile" (for desktop computers and displays) and "embedded profile" (for the internal display of a laptop computer).

Under the external profile, data was transmitted using three differential data pairs and one differential clock pair using the TMDS encoding scheme. The external profile is considered an extension of HDMI and is backwards-compatible with HDMI Rev. 1.2 displays; however, UDI does not carry audio information as it is targeted towards high-resolution computer monitors instead. As HDMI is itself an extension of DVI with HDCP, UDI external profile is compatible with these standards as well.

The embedded profile was slightly different, using either one or three differential pairs, each of which carried both data and clock information. The embedded profile uses an ANSI 8b/10b encoding scheme instead.

UDI provided higher bandwidth than its predecessors (up to 16 Gbit/s in its first version, compared to 4.95 Gbit/s for HDMI 1.0) and incorporated a form of digital rights management known as HDCP.

Connector
The external and embedded connector implementations were electrically compatible and physically similar, each with a single row of contacts, but they had different form factors and contact counts. The "embedded" implementation was only specified for the display panel interface and had a single row of 26 contacts, while the "external" implementation had a single row of 22 contacts inside a metal shield with a physically keyed rectangular cross-section, resembling the USB Type A connectors.

Three of the contacts were reserved for future upgrade possibilities. Transmit and receive plugs and receptacles were different physically, similar to peripheral cables with USB-A and USB-B on each end, requiring the UDI cable to be plugged in one way only. Bidirectional communication worked at a much lower data rate than that available for the single direction video datastream.

Notes

References

External links
 
 

Digital display connectors
High-definition television